Woman in Me is the second studio album by English singer Louise, released by EMI in October 1997. The album was preceded by the release of the single "Arms Around the World", which peaked at number 4 on the UK Singles Chart, becoming Louise's highest charting single at the time. This was quickly followed up by the single "Let's Go Round Again" (a cover of the 1980 hit by the Average White Band), which reached number 10. A third single, "All That Matters", peaked at number 11.

By this time, Louise's popularity was at an all-time high; Woman in Me had been certified platinum for UK sales of over 300,000 copies, she was on the cover of various magazines including Smash Hits and GQ, and had been voted 'The Sexiest Woman in the World' by the readers of FHM magazine. The 'Louise Soft and Gentle No Sweat Tour' was also a success and was one of the first tours to be choreographed by Jamie King.

Track listing
"Arms Around the World" (George/Noel/Louise Nurding/Trevor Steel/John Holiday) – 4:11
"All That Matters" (Jeff Franzel/Nina Ossoff/T.Silverlight) – 3:40
"I Pray" (Joe Kipnis) – 4:55
"Let's Go Round Again" (Alan Gorrie) – 4:01
"Woman in Me" (Trevor Steel/John Holiday/B.Thiele) – 3:49
"Trust in You" (Graham Plato/Louise Nurding/N.Lowis) – 5:12
"Reminds Me of You" (P.Shane/Kenedy/Pescotto) – 3:58
"Shut Up & Kiss Me" (Noel/George/Trevor Steel/John Holiday) – 3:40
"Healing Love" (Simon Climie/Noel/George) – 5:13
"When Will My Heart Beat Again" (Graham Plato/Louise Nurding/N.Lowis) – 4:26
"New York Moon" (Barry Blue/Robyn Smith) – 4:25
"Happy Love" (Charlie Mole/Gerry D'eveaux) – 4:15
"Who Do You Love" (Peter Kearney/Steve Robson) – 4:09
"Don't Be Shy" (Graham Plato/Louise Nurding/N.Lowis) – 4:52
"Running Back for More" (Louise Nurding/Graham Plato/N.Lowis) – 3:46
"Love Will Bring You Back to Me" (Jodie Wilson/Berny Cosgrove/Kevin Clark) – 4:16
"Distraction" Japanese bonus track
"How You Make Me Feel" Japanese bonus track

Tour

Charts

Weekly charts

Year-end charts

Certifications

References

1997 albums
Louise Redknapp albums